Psittacastis cocae is a moth in the family Depressariidae. August Busck described it in 1931. It is found in Peru.

The larvae feed on the leaves of Erythroxylon coca.

References

Moths described in 1931
Psittacastis